Free right turn may refer to:
 An intersection where turn on red is not prohibited
 A slip lane that permits an unsignalized right turn